The Penn State University Press, also known as The Pennsylvania State University Press, was established in 1956 and is a non-profit publisher of scholarly books and journals. It is the independent publishing branch of the Pennsylvania State University and is a division of the Penn State University Library system. Penn State University Press publishes books and journals of interest to scholars and general audiences. As a part of a land-grant university with a mandate to serve the citizens of the commonwealth of Pennsylvania, it also specializes in works about Penn State University, Pennsylvania, and the mid-Atlantic region. The areas of scholarship the Press is best known for are art history, medieval studies, Latin American studies, rhetoric and communication, religious studies, and Graphic Medicine. In 2016 the Press launched PSU Press Unlocked, an open access platform featuring over 70 books and journals. The Press acquired academic publisher Eisenbrauns, which specializes in ancient Near East and biblical studies, in November 2017. Eisenbrauns continues to publish as an imprint of the Press.

The Pennsylvania State University Press produces about 80 books a year and over 60 journals. The Press employs 25 to 30 people, and has several internship programs for Penn State students interested in a publishing career.

Some of the Press's most notable titles include:
 The Hidden Life of Life: A Walk through the Reaches of Time by Elizabeth Marshall Thomas
 The Noisy Renaissance: Sound, Architecture, and Florentine Urban Life by Niall Atkinson
 Graphic Medicine Manifesto by MK Czerwiec, Ian Williams, Susan Merrill Squier, Michael J. Green, Kimberly R. Myers, and Scott T. Smith
 Henry James and American Painting by Colm Tóibín, Marc Simpson and Declan Kiely
 Medieval Studies and the Ghost Stories of M. R. James by Patrick Murphy
 Field Guide to Wild Mushrooms of Pennsylvania and the Mid-Atlantic by Bill Russell
 Ernest Hemingway: A New Life by James M. Hutchisson
 The English translation of The Holy Teaching of Vimalakirti by Robert Thurman

The first book published by Penn State University Press was Penn State Yankee: The Autobiography of Fred Lewis Pattee, the autobiography of a noted Penn State faculty member who was the first professor of American literature in the United States.

Journals 

 ab-Original: Journal of Indigenous Studies and First Nations and First Peoples' Cultures
 AMP: American Music Perspectives
 The Arthur Miller Journal
 Bishop–Lowell Studies
 Bulletin for Biblical Research
 Bustan: The Middle East Book Review
 Calíope: Journal of the Society for Renaissance and Baroque Hispanic Poetry
 The Chaucer Review: A Journal of Medieval Studies and Literary Criticism
 Comedia Performance: Journal of the Association for Hispanic Classical Theater
 Comparative Literature Studies
 The Cormac McCarthy Journal
 Critical Philosophy of Race
 Dickens Studies Annual: Essays on Victorian Fiction
 Ecumenica: Performance and Religion
 The Edgar Allan Poe Review
 Edith Wharton Review
 The Eugene O'Neill Review
 The F. Scott Fitzgerald Review
 George Eliot–George Henry Lewes Studies
 Gestalt Review
 The Good Society: A Journal of Civic Studies
 The Harold Pinter Review: Essays on Contemporary Drama
 Hiperboreea
 Hungarian Studies Review
 Interdisciplinary Literary Studies: A Journal of Criticism and Theory
 International Journal of Persian Literature
 Journal for the Study of Paul and His Letters
 Journal of African Development
 Journal of Africana Religions
 Journal of Asia-Pacific Pop Culture
 The Journal of Assessment and Institutional Effectiveness
 Journal of Austrian-American History
 The Journal of Ayn Rand Studies
 Journal of Comparative Philology
 Journal of Development Perspectives
 Journal of Eastern Mediterranean Archaeology and Heritage Studies
 Journal of General Education: A Curricular Commons of the Humanities and Sciences
 Journal of Information Policy
 The Journal of Jewish Ethics
 Journal of Medieval Religious Cultures
 Journal of Minority Achievement, Creativity, and Leadership
 Journal of Modern Periodical Studies
 Journal of Moravian History
 Journal of Natural Resources Policy Research
 The Journal of Nietzsche Studies
 Journal of Posthuman Studies: Philosophy, Technology, Media
 Journal of Speculative Philosophy
 Journal of the Pennsylvania Academy of Science
 Journal of Theological Interpretation
 The Journal of World Christianity
 The Korean Language in America
 The Langston Hughes Review
 Libraries: Culture, History, and Society
 The Mark Twain Annual
 Mediterranean Studies
 Milton Studies
 Nathaniel Hawthorne Review
 Nineteenth Century Studies
 Pacific Coast Philology
 Pennsylvania History: A Journal of Mid-Atlantic Studies
 Philosophia Africana: Analysis of Philosophy and Issues in Africa and the Black Diaspora
 Philosophy & Rhetoric
 Preternature: Critical and Historical Studies on the Preternatural
 Reception: Texts, Readers, Audiences, History
 Resources for American Literary Study
 SHAW: The Journal of Bernard Shaw Studies
 Soundings: An Interdisciplinary Journal
 Steinbeck Review
 Studies in American Humor
 Studies in American Jewish Literature
 Studies in the American Short Story
 Style
 Theatre and Performance Notes and Counternotes
 Thornton Wilder Journal
 Transformations: The Journal of Inclusive Scholarship and Pedagogy
 Transportation Journal
 Utopian Studies
 Victorians Institute Journal
 Wesley and Methodist Studies
 William Carlos Williams Review

See also

 List of English-language book publishing companies
 List of university presses

References

External links
 

Pennsylvania State University
University presses of the United States
Book publishing companies based in Pennsylvania
Publishing companies established in 1956